Paripoornanand Painuli (19 November 1924 – 12 April 2019) was an Indian politician and a member of the 5th Lok Sabha. He represented the Tehri Garhwal Lok Sabha Constituency and was a member of the Congress political party.

Position Held

References

1924 births
Indian National Congress politicians from Uttar Pradesh
People from Dehradun district
India MPs 1971–1977
Lok Sabha members from Uttar Pradesh
2019 deaths